The 2009 USTA Challenger of Oklahoma was a professional tennis tournament played on outdoor hard courts. It was the first edition of the tournament which was part of the 2009 ATP Challenger Tour. It took place in Tulsa, Oklahoma, United States between 14 and 20 September 2009.

Singles main-draw entrants

Seeds

 Rankings are as of August 31, 2009.

Other entrants
The following players received wildcards into the singles main draw:
  Taylor Dent
  Austin Krajicek
  David Martin
  Blake Strode

The following players received entry from the qualifying draw:
  Arnau Brugués Davi
  Andrei Dăescu
  Daniel Garza
  Oleksandr Nedovyesov

Champions

Singles

 Taylor Dent def.  Wayne Odesnik, 7–6(9), 7–6(4)

Doubles

 David Martin /  Rajeev Ram def.  Phillip Stephens /  Ashley Watling, 6–2, 6–2

External links
Official site
ITF Search 

USTA Challenger of Oklahoma